Leval may refer to:
Leval, Nord, a commune in the Nord-Pas-de-Calais region of France
Leval, Territoire de Belfort, a commune in the Franche-Comté region of France
Leval-Trahegnies, a town in the Hainaut province of Belgium

 See also
 Le Val (disambiguation)
 Laval (disambiguation)